Jayne Anne Phillips (born July 19, 1952) is an American novelist and short story writer who was born in the small town of Buckhannon, West Virginia.

Education
Phillips graduated from West Virginia University, earning a B.A. in 1974, and later graduated from the Iowa Writers' Workshop at the University of Iowa.

Teaching
Phillips has held teaching positions at several colleges and universities, including Harvard University, Williams College, Brandeis University, and Boston University. She is currently Professor of English and founder/director of the Rutgers University–Newark Master of Fine Arts in Creative Writing Program. During its inaugural year, The Atlantic magazine named Phillips' MFA program at Rutgers–Newark to its list of "Five Up-and-Coming" creative writing programs in the United States.

Writing career

Short stories
 Sweethearts (1976)
 Counting (1978)
 Black Tickets (1979)
 How Mickey Made It (1981)
 The Secret Country (1982)
 Fast Lanes (1984)

During the mid-1970s she left West Virginia for California, embarking on a cross-country trip that would lead to numerous jobs, experiences, and encounters that would greatly affect her fiction, with its focus on lonely, lost souls and struggling survivors.

In 1976, Truck Press published her first short story collection Sweethearts, for which Phillips earned a Pushcart Prize and the Coordinating Council of Literary Magazines Fels Award.

Sweethearts was followed in 1978 by a second small-press collection, Counting, issued by Vehicle Editions. Counting earned Phillips greater recognition and the St. Lawrence Award.

Her next collection, Black Tickets, published by Delacorte/Seymour Lawrence in 1979 when she was 26, was her first book of stories and brought her national attention as a talented and important writer.  Black Tickets contained three types of stories: one page fictions, inner soliloquies, and family dramas. These stories focused on her characters' loneliness, alienation, and unsuccessful searches for happiness. Black Tickets is mentioned in the 2006 lectures for the Modern Scholar series installment From Here to Infinity, by Professor Michael D. C. Drout, who refers to her style—which he asserts was a direct influence on William Gibson's 1984 cyberpunk novel Neuromancer—as a "headlong rush of story and description". Called "the unmistakable work of early genius" by Tillie Olsen, Black Tickets was praised by Raymond Carver: “These stories of America’s disenfranchised – men and women light-years away from the American Dream – are quite unlike any in our literature ... this book is a crooked beauty.” Black Tickets was awarded the Sue Kaufman Prize for First Fiction by the American Academy and Institute of Arts and Letters.

Phillips followed with a (1984) first novel, Machine Dreams, “a remarkable novelistic debut and an enduring literary achievement.” (The New York Times),'|Machine Dreams]]” is a chronicle of the Hampson family from World War II to the Vietnam War. A National Book Critic's Circle Award Finalist in Fiction, was one of 12 Best Books of the Year cited by the New York Times. It made several Bestseller lists and was optioned as a film by actor Jessica Lange, who wrote the screenplay.  Nobel Prize winner Nadine Gordimer said of Machine Dreams: “Reaches one’s deepest emotions. No number of books read or films seen can deaden one to the intimate act of art by which this wonderful young writer has penetrated the definitive experience of her generation.”
Fast Lanes, a 1988 collection of ten stories, all first-person narratives, was praised as work by a writer “in love with the American language.”

Novels
 Machine Dreams (1984)
 Shelter (1994)
 MotherKind (2000)
 Lark & Termite (2008)
 Quiet Dell  (2013)

In 1994, Phillips published her second novel, Shelter, a portrait of the loss of innocence at a West Virginia girls' camp in the summer of 1963. Called “a rich, vivid novel of moral and psychological complexity destined to stand alongside works by Faulkner and other Southern masters” (Vanity Fair) and “a defiant, frighteningly beautiful novel as disturbing as its setting, Shelter feels like Phillips’ bid for immortality” (Harpers Bazaar), Shelter was awarded an Academy Award in Literature by the American Academy and Institute of Arts and Letters.

Phillips' next novel was MotherKind (2000), winner of the Massachusetts Book Award, a story of intergenerational love and struggles within a family facing many changes. It is praised as one of the best novels about mothers and infants and the mother/daughter bond.

Lark and Termite, her fourth novel, was published by Knopf in 2009 to extremely positive reviews and was selected as one of five finalists for the National Book Award in fiction. Lark and Termite was also a Finalist for the National Book Critic's Circle in Fiction; Lark et Termite (French translation by Marc Amfreville) was a Finalist for the Prix de Medici Etrangers (Paris).

Quiet Dell, Phillips’ fifth novel, based on the true story of the 1931 murders of Chicago widow Asta Eicher and her three children in the hamlet of Quiet Dell, WV, is a fictional portrayal of one of the nation's first sensationalized serial murders. Quiet Dell takes as its protagonist nine-year-old Annabel Eicher (victim, with her family, of con man Harry Powers, who found his victims through Depression-era matrimonial agencies) and Emily Thornhill, a Chicago Tribune journalist who commits herself to finding justice for the Eichers.  A Kirkus Review Fiction Pick of the Year and Wall Street Journal Best Book of the Year, Quiet Dell was called "a story both splendid and irreparably sad" by the Chicago Tribune: “As Phillips has proved throughout her decades of fiction writing, there is evil in the world but there are some who will stand in its way.”  Quiet Dell was praised by the Philadelphia Review of Books: “It is the texture of the telling that elevates this recounting from true crime to the realm of literary eminence.”

Phillips' works have been translated and published in twelve foreign languages. She is the recipient of a Guggenheim Fellowship, two National Endowment for the Arts Fellowships, a Bunting Fellowship from the Bunting Institute of Radcliffe College, a Rockefeller Foundation Bellagio Fellowship, and numerous other awards.

References

External links
 
Jayne Anne Phillips, An Interview at Narrative Magazine
Review of Lark and Termite in The New York Times
Q&A: Phillips Leads Newark’s New MFA at Poets & Writers
Faculty Page at Rutgers University–Newark
Interview with Jayne Anne Phillips at The Short Review

1952 births
Living people
20th-century American novelists
21st-century American novelists
American women novelists
American women short story writers
People from Buckhannon, West Virginia
West Virginia University alumni
Iowa Writers' Workshop alumni
Novelists from West Virginia
Writers from Boston
20th-century American women writers
21st-century American women writers
20th-century American short story writers
21st-century American short story writers
Novelists from Massachusetts
Members of the American Academy of Arts and Letters